The 1975 Nippon Professional Baseball season was the 26th season of operation for the league.
This would be a watershed year for the league at large with the Pacific League officially adopting the designated hitter rule, just two years following its introduction in Major League Baseball with the American League.

Regular season standings

Central League

Pacific League

Pacific League Playoff
The Pacific League teams with the best first and second-half records met in a best-of-five playoff series to determine the league representative in the Japan Series.

Hankyu Braves won the series 3-1.

Japan Series

Hankyu Braves won the series 4-0-2.

See also
1975 Major League Baseball season

References

1975 in baseball
1975 in Japanese sport